Sarah Louise Holloway, FAcSS, is a British geographer, and academic. Since 2010, she has been Professor of Human Geography at Loughborough University.

Education and career 
Holloway carried out her doctoral studies at the University of Sheffield; her PhD was awarded in 1996 for her thesis "Space, place and geographies of childcare". In 1994, she was appointed to a lectureship at Loughborough University and was eventually promoted to Reader in Human Geography. In 2010, she was appointed Professor of Human Geography at Loughborough.

In 2013, Holloway was elected a Fellow of the Academy of Social Sciences.

Publications 

 (Co-authored with Nina Laurie, Claire Dwyer and Fiona M. Smith) Geographies of New Femininities (Longman, 1999).
 (Edited with Gill Valentine) Children's Geographies: Playing, Living, Learning (Routledge, 2000).
 (Co-authored with Gill Valentine) Cyberkids: Children in the Information Age (Routledge, 2003).
 (Edited with Stephen P. Rice and Gill Valentine) Key Concepts in Geography (Sage, 2003).
 (Co-authored with Gill Valentine, Mark Jayne and Charlotte A. Knell) Drinking Places: Where People Drink and Why (Joseph Rowntree Foundation, 2007).
 (Edited with Nick Clifford, Stephen P. Rice and Gill Valentine) Key Concepts in Human Geography (Sage, 2009).
 (Edited with Mark Jayne and Gill Valentine) Alcohol, Drinking and Drunkenness: (Dis)Orderly Spaces (Ashgate, 2011).

References 

Living people
Year of birth missing (living people)
Human geographers
British geographers
Women geographers
Alumni of the University of Sheffield
Academics of Loughborough University
Fellows of the Academy of Social Sciences